Arthur Christo Bouwer (born ) is a South African-born Namibian rugby union player, that played international rugby for the Namibia national team between 2012 and 2016. He usually played as a scrum-half.

Rugby career
Bouwer was born in Sasolburg in South Africa, but grew up in Windhoek.

In June 2016, he represented Namibia at the 2016 World Rugby Nations Cup in Bucharest, where he tested positively for banned substance chlorodehydromethyltestosterone. World Rugby imposed a four-year ban on Bouwer, ruling him out of action until 11 July 2020.

References

External links
 

1989 births
Living people
People from Sasolburg
South African rugby union players
Rugby union scrum-halves
Namibia international rugby union players
Doping cases in rugby union
Rugby union players from the Free State (province)